José Iván Gutiérrez Palacios (born 27 November 1978 in Hinojedo, Suances, Cantabria) is a Spanish former professional road bicycle racer. He was a two-time Spanish national road race champion, three time Spanish time trial champion and won a silver medal in the 2005 Time Trial World Championships. He retired in 2014 with UCI ProTeam , the team he rode the vast majority of his career for.

Major results

1999
 1st  Time trial, UCI Road World Under–23 Championships
2000
 1st  Time trial, National Road Championships
2001
 1st  Road race, National Road Championships
 1st G.P. CTT Correios
2002
 1st GP Llodio
 1st Stage 2 Vuelta a Burgos
2003
 1st Giro Dell'Emilia
 1st Escalada a Montjuïc
2004
 1st  Time trial, National Road Championships
 1st Stage 1 Vuelta a Castilla y León
 2nd Overall Vuelta a Murcia
1st  Points classification
1st Stage 2 (ITT)
2005
 1st  Time trial, National Road Championships
 1st  Mountains classification Critérium du Dauphiné Libéré
 1st Clásica de Almería
 2nd  Time trial, UCI Road World Championships
2006
 1st  Overall Vuelta a Murcia
1st Stage 3 (ITT)
 Vuelta a Burgos
1st Stages 3 (ITT) & 5
 4th Overall Tour Méditerranéen
1st  Points classification
1st Stage 2
 4th Overall Critérium International
2007
 1st  Time trial, National Road Championships
 1st  Overall Tour Méditerranéen
1st Stage 1
 1st  Overall Eneco Tour of Benelux
 7th Time trial, UCI Road World Championships
2008
 1st  Overall Eneco Tour of Benelux
1st Prologue
 4th Overall Volta a la Comunitat Valenciana
1st Stage 1
  Combativity award Stage 14 Tour de France
2009
 1st Stage 2 (TTT) Tour Méditerranéen
 5th Time trial, National Road Championships
2010
 National Road Championships
1st  Road race
2nd Time trial
 3rd Trofeo Deia
 6th Overall Vuelta a Burgos
 6th Trofeo Inca
2011
 3rd Time trial, National Road Championships
 7th Vuelta a La Rioja
2012
 5th Time trial, National Road Championships

Grand Tour general classification results timeline

References

External links

1978 births
Living people
Cyclists from Cantabria
Cyclists at the 2004 Summer Olympics
Olympic cyclists of Spain
People from the Besaya Valley
Spanish male cyclists